Pontefract Hospital is an acute District General Hospital in Pontefract, West Yorkshire operated by the Mid Yorkshire Hospitals NHS Trust.  The hospital primarily serves the towns of Pontefract and the five towns.


History

The original hospital in Pontefract was the Pontefract Dispensary which was established in Sessions House Yard in 1812. The foundation stone for a new hospital in Southgate was laid by Hugh Childers, Secretary of State for War on 7 May 1880; it was opened by John Rhodes, the Mayor of Wakefield, on 8 December 1880. The facility became Pontefract General Infirmary on the formation of the National Health Service in 1948.

A new hospital, to be known as the Pontefract Hospital, was procured under a Private Finance Initiative contract to replace Pontefract General Infirmary in 2007. The new hospital, which was designed by the Building Design Partnership and built by Balfour Beatty at a cost of circa £150 million, was completed in January 2010. It was opened by the Duke of Gloucester in July 2010.

In March 2018 it was announced that the Accident and Emergency Department at Pontefract Hospital would be reclassified as a 24-hour Urgent Treatment Centre from the following months with people with life-threatening injuries being sent to the nearest A&E department which is at, Pinderfields Hospital instead. The local MP, Yvette Cooper, responded to the action:

In October 2019, Mid Yorkshire Trust announced that the maternity-led birth centre would be shut until October 2020 "on the grounds of safety" due to a national shortage of midwives. It also announced that it would be closing 12 of the 42 beds at the hospital's stroke and rehabilitation unit. Local MP Yvette Cooper has led a campaign against the action, calling it  "an absolute disgrace".

References

External links

 Official site

Hospitals in West Yorkshire
Hospital buildings completed in 2010
NHS hospitals in England
Pontefract